Ratubhai Mulshankar Adani (13 April, 1914-1977) is an Indian politician and social activist from Gujarat. He served as a member of legislative assemblies of Saurashtra, Bombay and Gujarat as well as minister in state cabinets of them.

Early life 
Adani was born on 13 April 1914 in Jasdan or Bhanvad (now in Devbhoomi Dwarka district, Gujarat, India). Influenced by Mahatma Gandhi, he participated in Indian independence movement. In 1930, he was imprisoned for two years for participating in the Dholera movement. In 1936, he was involved in social and economic activities in Taravada village near Amreli. He founded the Kathiawad Kranti Dal (Kathiawar Revolution Force) during the 1942 Quit India movement. Following the independence of India, he served as the Commander-in-Chief of the People's Army of the Arzi Hakumat (provisional government) which was instrumental during the annexation of Junagadh in 1947.

Political career 
Adani was elected as a member of constitution assembly of Saurashtra in 1948. Later he was elected as a member of legislative assembly of Saurashtra State in 1952 from Keshod constituency and served as a minister in state cabinet. Following merger of Saurashtra with Bombay State, he was a minister of Panchayat, prohibition and cottage industry department. Following establishment of Gujarat in 1960, he served as a minister of public works and labour department. Following 1962 election, he was a minister of road and public works department under Jivraj Mehta government from 1962-63. During his tenure, Panchayati Raj was established in Gujarat. He later served as a minister of agriculture, forest, cooperatives and Panchayat department under Balwantrai Mehta government from 1963-65.

He was also president of Gujarat state unit of Indian National Congress from 1970 to 1972. He again served as the minister from 1972 to 1974. In 1977, he was responsible for Congress (I) in Gujarat. He voluntarily retired from politics and served in social organisations.

He wrote Dithu Me Gamadu Aa and Satyagrahna Samaranganma Volume I-II.

He died on 5 September 1997 in Rajkot.

References

Indian National Congress politicians from Gujarat
State cabinet ministers of Gujarat
Place of birth missing
1914 births
1997 deaths
Gujarat MLAs 1960–1962
Gujarat MLAs 1962–1967
Bombay State MLAs 1957–1960
Indian independence activists from Gujarat
Saurashtra MLAs 1952–1956